The 118th New York State Legislature, consisting of the New York State Senate and the New York State Assembly, met from January 2 to May 16, 1895, during the first year of Levi P. Morton's governorship, in Albany.

Background
Under the provisions of the New York Constitution of 1846, 32 Senators and 128 assemblymen were elected in single-seat districts; senators for a two-year term, assemblymen for a one-year term. The senatorial districts were made up of entire counties, except New York County (nine districts), Kings County (five districts) and Erie County (two districts). The Assembly districts were made up of entire towns, or city wards, forming a contiguous area, all within the same county.

A Constitutional Convention met at the State Capitol in Albany from May 8 to September 29, 1894. The new Constitution was submitted to the electorate for ratification at the state election on November 6.

At this time there were two major political parties: the Republican Party and the Democratic Party. Two Democratic anti-machine factions (the "Democratic Reform Organization" in Brooklyn, and the "Empire State Democracy" in New York City), the Prohibition Party, the Socialist Labor Party and the People's Party also nominated tickets.

Elections
The New York state election, 1894 was held on November 6.

Ex-U.S. Vice President Levi P. Morton was elected Governor; and President pro tempore of the State Senate Charles T. Saxton was elected Lieutenant Governor (both Rep.). The only other statewide elective offices up for election was also carried by a Republican. The approximate party strength at this election, as expressed by the vote for Governor, was: Republican 674,000; Democratic/Empire State 518,000; Democratic Reform 27,000; Prohibition 24,000; Socialist Labor 16,000; and People's Party 11,000.

Besides, the new Constitution was adopted by the voters, and took effect on January 1, 1895. The new Constitution moved the day for the first meeting of the Legislature from the first Tuesday in January to the first Wednesday, and the 118th Legislature convened on Wednesday, January 2, 1895.

Sessions
The Legislature met for the regular session at the State Capitol in Albany on January 2, 1895; and adjourned on May 16.

Hamilton Fish II (Rep.) was elected Speaker against Samuel J. Foley (Dem.).

Edmund O'Connor (Rep.) was elected president pro tempore of the State Senate.

On February 13, the Legislature elected Charles R. Skinner (Rep.) as Superintendent of Public Instruction, to succeed James F. Crooker for a term of three years.

On May 14, Assemblyman Eugene F. Vacheron was indicted for asking for a bribe (a misdemeanor), and for accepting a bribe (a felony). He was accused of having received $3,000 to kill the "Hudson River Ice Bill" in the Assembly Committee on Internal Affairs. After many postponements the case was tried in December 1896 and Vacheron was acquitted.

State Senate

Districts

Note: There are now 62 counties in the State of New York. The counties which are not mentioned in this list had not yet been established, or sufficiently organized, the area being included in one or more of the abovementioned counties.

Members
The asterisk (*) denotes members of the previous Legislature who continued in office as members of this Legislature.

Employees
 Clerk: John S. Kenyon
 Assistant Clerk: Charles A. Ball
 Sergeant-at-Arms: Charles V. Schram
 Doorkeeper: Edward Dowling
 Stenographer: Lucius A. Waldo
 Journal Clerk: Lafayette B. Gleason
 Postmaster: Stephen C. Green

State Assembly

Assemblymen
The asterisk (*) denotes members of the previous Legislature who continued as members of this Legislature.

Employees
 Clerk: Archie E. Baxter
 Assistant Clerk: Haines D. Cunningham
Financial Clerk: William C. Stevens
 Sergeant-at-Arms: Garret J. Benson
 Doorkeeper: Joseph Bauer
 Stenographer: Robert C. Chapin
 Journal Clerk: Edward M. Johnson

Notes

Sources
 The New York Red Book compiled by Edgar L. Murlin (published by James B. Lyon, Albany NY, 1897; see pg. 385 for senate districts; pg. 404 for senators; pg. 410–417 for Assembly districts; and pg. 511f for assemblymen)
 Sketches of the members of the Legislature in The Evening Journal Almanac (1895; pg. 48–64)
 HAMILTON FISH SPEAKER in NYT on January 2, 1895
 NEW STATE LEGISLATURE in NYT on January 3, 1895

118
1895 in New York (state)
1895 U.S. legislative sessions